The Shuttle Ejection Escape Suit used from STS-1 (1981) to STS-4 (1982) by a two-man crew used in conjunction with the then-installed ejection seats. It allowed ejections up to Mach 2.7 and 24.4 km (80,000 ft). The suit was manufactured by the David Clark Company of Worcester, Massachusetts. It was derived from the USAF Model S1030 suit, which at the time, was being worn by SR-71 pilots. Both the ejection suits and ejection seats were removed after the Shuttle became certified.

Specifications
Name: Shuttle Ejection Escape Suit (S1030A)
Derived from: USAF Model S1030
Manufacturer: David Clark Company
Missions: STS-1 to STS-4
Function: Intra-vehicular activity (IVA) and Ejection
Operating Pressure: 2.7 psi (18.6 kPa)
Suit Weight: 40 lb (18 kg)
Primary Life Support: Vehicle Provided
Backup Life Support: Vehicle Provided

Images

References

American spacesuits